The United Kingdom Model for End-Stage Liver Disease or UKELD is a medical scoring system used to predict the prognosis of patients with chronic liver disease. It is used in the United Kingdom to help determine the need for liver transplantation. It was developed from the MELD score, incorporating the serum sodium level.

Determination 
The UKELD score is calculated from the patient's INR, serum creatinine, serum bilirubin and serum sodium, according to the formula:

Interpretation 
Higher UKELD scores equate to higher one-year mortality risk. A UKELD score of 49 indicates a 9% one-year risk of mortality, and is the minimum score required to be added to the liver transplant waiting list in the U.K. A UKELD score of 60 indicates a 50% chance of one-year survival.

History 
The UKELD score was developed in 2008 to aid in the selection of patients for liver transplantation in the U.K.

See also 
 Model for End-Stage Liver Disease
 MELD-Plus
 Pediatric End-Stage Liver Disease
 Milan criteria
 Child-Pugh score

References

External links 
  (Microsoft Excel file)

Hepatology
Medical scoring system
Digestive system procedures